Aron Ra (formerly L. Aron Nelson, born October 15, 1962) is an American author, podcaster and atheist activist. Ra is the host of the Ra-Men Podcast and a member of the American Atheists board of directors. He had previously served as president of the Atheist Alliance of America and ran as a Democratic candidate for Texas' District 2 Senate seat.

Early life and education 
Aron Ra was born in Kingman, Arizona, and baptized as a Mormon. Despite his religious upbringing, he states that he has been a skeptic from a young age.

He studied paleontology at the University of Texas in Dallas. He holds an Associate's degree from Dallas College and, in 2022, earned a Bachelor of Science in Anthropology from the School of Human Evolution and Social Change at Arizona State University.

Career 
A vocal critic of theism and creationism and an advocate for the inclusion of evolution in science curricula, Ra produces YouTube videos on the topics of skepticism, free thought, and atheism. Among the video series he has released are Foundational Falsehoods of Creationism, Refuting the Irrefutable Proof of God, and How Aron Ra Disproves Noah's Flood.

He has engaged in live debates with young Earth creationists, including Ray Comfort, and presented at skepticism conferences in Europe. As a member of the Unholy Trinity, he toured the United States and Australia with fellow atheist activists Seth Andrews of The Thinking Atheist and Matt Dillahunty of The Atheist Experience. 

He appeared in the documentary films My Week in Atheism, directed by John Christy, and Batman & Jesus, directed by Jozef K. Richards. He published his first book, Foundational Falsehoods of Creationism, in 2016.

Ra is the creator of the Phylogeny Explorer Project, a free, volunteer-run online encyclopedia of the entire phylogenetic tree of life that is currently in progress.

Political candidacy and views 
In March 2017, Ra resigned from his position as president of the Atheist Alliance of America to run for the Texas State Senate against Republican incumbent Bob Hall.  The first Democratic candidate to run for the District 2 seat since 2002, he dropped out of the race after failing to secure the Democratic Party endorsement.

Ra identifies as a feminist and as a Satanist.

Books 
 Foundational Falsehoods of Creationism (2016)
 We Are All Apes (2022)

References

External links 

 

Living people
1962 births
20th-century atheists
21st-century atheists
American atheism activists
American feminists
American male non-fiction writers
American podcasters
American Satanists
American skeptics
American secularists
American YouTubers
Critics of creationism
Critics of religions
Education activists
Former Latter Day Saints
People from Kingman, Arizona
Male feminists
Texas Democrats
Secular humanists
Activists from Arizona
Activists from Texas
Christ myth theory proponents